Garret S. Cannon (March 1, 1818 – April 21, 1889) was a lawyer who served as United States Attorney for the District of New Jersey under two presidents.

Biography
Born in Somerset, New Jersey, Garret was born to a professor and a house wife. At 18 he graduated Rutgers in 1833, and soon began to practice law in Mount Holly. He would go on to be a part of the New Jersey State Assembly, and later serve as the United States Attorney for the district of New Jersey from 1853 to 1861. He would go out to live out the rest of his life in Bordentown, New Jersey until his death in 1889.

References

1818 births
1889 deaths
American people of English descent
United States Attorneys for the District of New Jersey
New Jersey lawyers
Rutgers University alumni
New Jersey Democrats
People from Bordentown, New Jersey
People from Franklin Township, Somerset County, New Jersey
19th-century American lawyers